Barry Turner  may refer to:

Barry Turner (politician) (born 1946), Canadian politician and lobbyist
Barry Turner (author), British author, editor and journalist
Barry Turner (American football) (born 1987), American football defensive end